Moonchild is a 1974 American independent horror film directed and produced by Alan Gadney. It was originally shot in 1971 as a student film (a Masters thesis project at the University of Southern California). The film received limited commercial release under the title The Moon Child, but failed to make much of an initial impression on audiences.  It has since gained recognition among film enthusiasts who discovered it due to its impressive cast of character actors: John Carradine, Victor Buono, Pat Renella, Janet Landgard and William Challee.

Plot
A young man (The Moon Child) is reincarnated every 25 years, with each life ending in a stay at a mission hotel.  There he meets characters from his first life, all of whom are doomed to relive their roles in his life (and death) as well.  The cycle will end when his spirit reaches a state of perfection by purging its negative (violent) impulses. Actor John Carradine is The Walker of The World, an otherworldly poet who is there to observe, and record for posterity, the proceedings.

See also
 List of American films of 1974

References

1974 films
1974 horror films
American independent films
American supernatural horror films
Films about reincarnation
Films scored by Patrick Williams
Theses
American student films
University of Southern California
1970s American films